Edward L. French (August 19, 1860 – July 29, 1947) was an American politician in the state of Washington. He served in the Washington State Senate and Washington House of Representatives. From 1915 to 1917, he was President pro tempore of the Senate.

References

1860 births
1947 deaths
Republican Party Washington (state) state senators
Republican Party members of the Washington House of Representatives